Marco Antonio Ruíz García (born 12 July 1969) is a Mexican former professional footballer and current head coach of Liga MX team Tigres UANL. 

A midfielder, he appeared in 16 matches for the Mexico national team and was a member of the Mexico squad at the 2001 FIFA Confederations Cup, where he played in all three matches.

Career
Nicknamed "Chima," Ruiz made his debut in 1986, with Tampico Madero "Jaiba Brava", where he received a fractured tibia and fibula from Fernando Quirarte in a match between Tampico Madero Vs U.de.G. . He played for several years during the 1990s with Tigres (a relegation included during the 1995-96 season), but his career did not really shine until he joined Guadalajara in 1998. He became a frequent starter with Chivas as a left-sided attacking midfielder, small in stature but an eager dribbler. He helped Guadalajara reach the final of the Apertura championship in 1998, which ended in a loss to Necaxa. Although the club's fortunes soon entered a period of decline, Ruiz remained with Chivas for three more years until he rejoined Tigres in 2002. His final top-flight season came in the Apertura 2004 campaign.

Ruiz also represented the Mexico national team in international play. A late bloomer on the world stage, Ruiz made his international debut at the age of 31 against Ecuador on 20 September 2000, in which he scored a goal. His international career coincided entirely with the coaching tenure of Enrique Meza, who preferred him at the position of left wingback. Mexico's results dipped during the qualifying campaign for the 2002 FIFA World Cup, culminating in elimination from the 2001 FIFA Confederations Cup and a home defeat against Costa Rica. Meza came under intense pressure and was eventually dismissed in June 2001, and Ruiz was never capped again by any subsequent Mexico coaches. Ruiz's last international appearance came in a 3-1 defeat against Honduras in a World Cup qualifying match on 20 June 2001.

International goals 

Scores and results list Mexico's goal tally first.

Honours

Manager 
Mexico U17
 FIFA U-17 World Cup runner-up: 2019

References

External links 
 
 

1969 births
Living people
Mexican footballers
Mexico international footballers
Association football midfielders
C.D. Guadalajara footballers